The River Spey (Scottish Gaelic: Uisge Spè) is a river in the northeast of Scotland. At  it is the eighth longest river in the United Kingdom, as well as the second longest and fastest-flowing river in Scotland. It is important for salmon fishing and whisky production.

Etymology 
The origin of the name Spey is uncertain. A possible etymological genesis for the name Spey is Early Celtic *skwej-, meaning "thorn". The involvement of a Pictish form of Welsh ysbyddad, meaning "hawthorn", has been suggested, but adjudged unlikely. One proposal is a derivation from a Pictish cognate of Old Gaelic sceïd, "vomit" (c.f Welsh chwydu), which is dubious both on phonological and semantic grounds. Ptolemy named the river on his map of  150 as Tuesis. The name 'Spey' first appears in 1451.

Course

Some miles downstream from its source it is impounded by Spey Dam before continuing a descent through Newtonmore and Kingussie, crossing Loch Insh before reaching Aviemore, giving its name to Strathspey.

On some sections of its course, the Spey changes course frequently, either gradually as a result of deposition and erosion from normal flow, or in a matter of hours as a result of spate. The Spey spates quickly due to its wide mountainous catchment area as a result of rainfall or snow-melt.

Tributaries 
After leaving Loch Spey the river gathers numerous burns in the Corrieyarack, Sherramore and Glenshirra Forests. The first sizeable tributary is the Markie Burn which drops out of Glen Markie to the north to enter the waters of Spey impounded behind the Spey Dam. A further mile downstream the River Mashie enters from Strath Mashie to the south.

The River Truim enters on the right bank a couple of miles above Newtonmore and the Highland Calder enters from Glen Banchor on the left bank at Spey Bridge at Newtonmore. The sizeable River Feshie joins on the right bank at Kincraig and the River Druie does likewise at Aviemore. Several miles downstream the River Nethy joins from the east near Nethy Bridge and the River Dulnain originating in the Monadhliath contributes a considerable flow from the west near Dulnain Bridge.

Between Grantown-on-Spey  and Craigellachie, the Burn of Tulchan and Allt a Gheallaidh join from the west whilst the Spey's most important tributary, the River Avon joins from the east. The Allt Arder and Knockando Burn also join from the west near Knockando. The River Fiddich enters from the right at Craigellachie and the Burn of Rothes enters from the left at Rothes. Downstream more burns enter the Spey, the most important of which are the Burn of Mulben, Red Burn and Burn of Fochabers.

Industry

The river traditionally supported many local industries, from the salmon fishing industry to shipbuilding. At one stage, Garmouth functioned as the shipbuilding capital of Britain, with timber from the forests around Aviemore and Aberlour being rafted down to create wooden-hulled ships.

The river is known by anglers for the quality of its salmon and trout fishing, including a particular form of fly fishing where the angler uses a double-handed fly rod to throw a 'Spey cast' whereby the fly and the line do not travel behind the fisher (thereby keeping these away from the bushes and trees lining the banks behind him or her). This type of cast was developed on the Spey.

Speyside distilleries produce more whisky than any other region. Scotland's Malt Whisky Trail is a tourism initiative featuring seven working Speyside distilleries, a historic distillery and the Speyside Cooperage. The concept was created in the early 1980s. The region is a natural for whisky distillers because of three benefits: it is close to barley farms, contains the River Spey and is close to the port of Garmouth.

The Speyside Way, a long-distance footpath, follows the river through the County of Moray.

The River Spey is unusual in that its speed increases as it flows closer to the sea, due to a broadly convex long-profile. The Spey does not meander, although it rapidly moves its banks. South of Fochabers a high earth barrier reinforces the banks, but the river has broken through on several occasions, removing a large portion of Garmouth Golf Course, sections of wall surrounding Gordon Castle, parts of the Speyside Way and some of the B9104 road.

The Spey railway bridge (pedestrianised ) Spey Bay to Garmouth was originally designed with its main span over the main flow of the river, however before construction was completed the river had changed its course and was running at one end of the bridge.

Settlements
Starting from the source
Laggan
Newtonmore
Inverdruie
Aviemore
Boat of Garten
Grantown on Spey
Cromdale
Mains of Dalvey
Advie
Ballindalloch
Pitchroy
Blacksboat
Marypark
Knockando
Carron
Speyview
Aberlour
Craigellachie
Dandalieth
Rothes
Crofts
Newlands of Dundurcas
Garbity
Ordiequish
Fochabers
Upper Dallachy
Stynie
Garmouth
Kingston on Spey
Spey Bay

References

External links

Spey Fishery Board
The Moray Firth Wildlife Centre is situated at the mouth of the Spey River
Greater Speyside info
Guide to Canoeing on the River Spey
Canoe hire experts
Fishing on the Spey

 
Spey
Spey
Ramsar sites in Scotland
Sites of Special Scientific Interest in Badenoch and Strathspey
Sites of Special Scientific Interest in Moray and Nairn